Stathmopoda diplaspis is a moth of the Stathmopodidae family. It is found in United Kingdom, Saudi  Arabia, Iran, Afghanistan, Pakistan, India, Sri Lanka, Tajikistan, Afghanistan and Thailand.

Wingspan of adult 9.5 mm. Antenna copperish brown. Thorax ochreous brown. Forewing very narrow with a broad base. Forewing copperish brown, with two shining white patches. Hindwing very narrow, pale grey. Legs copperish brown. Abdomen pale grey with a pale yellow caudal tuft.

References

Stathmopodidae
Moths of Asia
Moths described in 1887
Taxa named by Edward Meyrick